Giovanni Becatti (5 December 1912 – 10 April 1973) was an Italian Classical art historian and archaeologist.

Born at Siena, Becatti was educated at the University of Rome under Giulio Giglioli. Becatti was appointed to the Superintendency of Ostia in 1938. He was professor of Archeology and History of Classical Art at the University of Pisa (1941–1944) and at the University La Sapienza of Rome (1945–1946).
 
From 1947 to 1950, he was Director of the excavations of Ostia Antica. Then Becatti moved to chair the department at the University of Milan from 1952 to 1956, in Florence from 1957 to 1964 and the University of Rome from 1964 to his premature death in 1973.
  
Becatti continued to publish on and excavate Ostia throughout his career. He altered his publishing interests from Etruscan subjects to Ancient Greek and Roman Art.

He was the editor of the prestigious Enciclopedia dell’Arte Antica (1958–1966), with and after Bianchi Bandinelli.  He was a visiting professor in the United States at Princeton University (1963–1964) and the University of Chicago (1969). He received the title of "Doctor Honoris Causa" from the University of Louvain (1969).

He was member of the Accademia Nazionale dei Lincei, of the Pontificia Accademia romana di Archeologia, of the Accademia della Arti del Disegno, of the Istituto di Studi etruschi e di Studi romani.

Bibliography
[collected articles:] Kosmos, studi sul mondo classico. Rome: Bretschneider, 1987
L'arte dell'età classica. Florence: Sansoni, 1971, (English ed.: The Art of Ancient Greece and Rome: from the Rise of Greece to the Fall of Rome. London: Thames and Hudson, 1968
L'arte romana. Milan: Garzanti, 1962
La colonna coclide istoriata; problemi storici, iconografici, stilistici. Studi e materiali del Museo dell'Impero romano 6. Rome: Bretschneider, 1960
Arte e gusto negli scrittori latini, 1946
Il Maestro di Olimpia, 1943
Meidias: un manierista antico. Florence: Sansoni,1947
Oreficerie antiche dalle minoiche alle barbariche. Rome: Istituto poligrafico dello Stato, 1955
Corpus vasorum antiquorum. Italia. Musei comunali umbri.  Rome: Libreria dello Stato, 1940.
Scavi di Ostia Antica:
I,Topografia,1954
II,Mitrei,1954
IV,Mosaici,1962
VI,Edificio con Opus Sectile fuori Porta Marina,1969

Further reading

Scritti in memoria di Giovanni Becatti, Becatti Giovanni, a cura di Guerrini Lucia, Roma, L'Erma di Bretscneider, 1977.
Giovanni Becatti, di Filippo Magi, Rendiconti della Pontificia Accademia Romana di Archeologia. vol.XLVII, 1974-1975.
Ridgway, F.R. "Giovanni Becatti".  Encyclopedia of the History of Classical Archaeology.  Nancy Thomson de Grummond, ed.  Westport, CT:  Greenwood Press, 1996, p. 136
Brilliant, Richard.  "Introduction."  Roman Art: from the Republic to Constantine.  New York: Phaidon, 1974, p. 16, mentioned.
Kosmos, studi sul mondo classico, Roma, L'Erma di Bretschneider, 1987

External links
 Short biography

1912 births
1973 deaths
People from Siena
Italian archaeologists
Italian art historians
Italian classical scholars
20th-century archaeologists